Guillaume Pousaz (born 1981/1982) is a Dubai-based Swiss billionaire entrepreneur, and the CEO and founder of payment platform Checkout.com. As of January 2022, he has an estimated net worth of US$20 billion.

Early life and education 
Pousaz studied mathematical engineering at Ecole Polytechnique Fédérale De Lausanne, before enrolling in an economics bachelor's degree at HEC Lausanne.

Pousaz initially wanted to become an investment banker, but dropped out of university in Switzerland in 2005 when his father got cancer. He then moved to California to become a surfer.

Career 
In 2006, Pousaz joined payments company International Payments Consultants (IPC) but left to found his own business.

In 2007, Pousaz set up NetMerchant, a US to Europe money transfer service, with IPC's head of sales. The company ran until 2009.

In 2009, Pousaz purchased Mauritius-based SMS Pay for US$300,000 over a three-year period.

Pousaz founded Opus Payments in Singapore in 2009, which enabled businesses in Hong Kong to process payments from buyers around the world.

Opus Payments rebranded and became Checkout.com in 2012. The company was founded to solve the problem of online payment processing for merchants and their customers.

In 2019, Checkout.com raised $230 million in funding. At the time, this was the largest Series A funding round ever for a European fintech company.

In January 2021, Checkout.com raised a further US$450 million at a valuation of US$15 billion. As a result, Forbes estimated Pousaz's net worth to be US$9 billion.

Pousaz is the CEO of Checkout.com and owns an estimated two-thirds of the company.

Pousaz set up a personal investment firm, Zinial Growth, in May of 2021. The firm has invested in e-commerce start-ups Ziina and Wayflyer and blockchain firm Snickerdoodle Labs.

In January 2022, after a $1 billion fundraising, Checkout.com was valued at US$40 billion, giving Pousaz an estimated net worth of about US$20 billion.

In the Sunday Times Rich List 2022 ranking of the wealthiest people in the UK he was placed 5th with an estimated net worth of £19.259 billion.

Personal life 
Pousaz lives in Dubai, is married and has three children (two sons and a daughter).

References 

Swiss businesspeople
Online remittance providers
Living people
Year of birth missing (living people)
1980s births
Swiss billionaires
Swiss company founders